Ground speed radar is a non-mechanical way of measuring the speed of a vehicle.
The Speed sensor fires a radar beam towards the ground and measures the Doppler shift of the returning beam. This information is then sent to the engine control unit which calculates the forward speed.

References

See also
Radar gun

Vehicle parts
Speed sensors